VolynBasket is a professional basketball club based in Lutsk, Ukraine. In the 2015–16 season, the team entered the Ukrainian SL Favorit Sport, a newly formed top tier league in Ukraine.

In 2021–22 season, the club plays in the third division of Ukrainian basketball.

Season by season

References

External links
Official website 

Basketball teams in Ukraine
Sport in Lutsk
Basketball teams established in 2007
2007 establishments in Ukraine